The Massís de l'Ardenya, also known as Massís de Cadiretes after the main range in the mountainous area, is a massif in the Costa Brava region, Catalonia, Spain.

The Ardenya Massif is part of the Catalan Coastal Range. The highest point is 519 m high Puig de les Cadiretes or Puig Cadiretes. Other important summits are Montagut (505 m), Montllor (470 m), Ruïra (444 m), and Puig de les Cols (416 m).

Geography
The Ardenya Massif is a quite compact mountainous terrain, granitic between the craggy portion near the sea and the forested plains to the west, the highest point of which is Puig Cadiretes (519 metres). The mountain ranges run broadly in a north-east / south-west direction and consist mostly of granite rock.

The ranges meet the sea between Sant Feliu de Guixols and Lloret de Mar, running westwards far as Caldes de Malavella. Most mountains are covered in occasionally dense forests of cork oak, holm oak, pine and Mediterranean shrub. The valleys are irrigated by seasonal mountain streams subject to the typically Mediterranean climate. However, the nature of the terrain favours up welling of water throughout the year, along with humidity and precipitation caused by the screen effect of the mountains before the marine winds. The botanic species, as well as the fauna show some Eurosiberian and Atlantic influences.

Protected area
The l'Ardenya-Cadiretes massif is a natural area that occupies almost the whole of Tossa de Mar municipality and part of Sant Feliu, Santa Cristina d'Aro, Llagostera, Vidreres, Caldes de Malavella and Lloret de Mar. A particularly rugged section of the coast, more than six kilometres in length, is also a protected area.

Subranges
The Cadiretes Massif is the main range of the Ardenya Massif. Other ranges are the L'Ardenya Massif proper, Carcaixells d'en Dalmau, Muntanyes de Llobatera, Muntanya d'en Bonet, Serra de les Comes and Serra d'Aiguafina.

See also
Costa Brava

References

External links 

Per la serra de l’Ardenya, bressol de la Costa Brava

Mountains of Catalonia